The Janata Dal (Ajit Jat) was a political party in India. It merged with the Indian National Congress in the early 1990s. Its leader, Ajit Singh became a Ministry of Food Processing Industries in government led by P.V. Narasimha Rao from 1991 to 1996.

Later Ajit Singh quit the Indian National Congress and later formed a new party, the Bharatiya Kisan Kamghar Party in 1996. In 1998, Mr Ajit Singh launched the Rashtriya Lok Dal which was one of the original parties run by his father and former Prime Minister of India, Ch Charan Singh and was part of NDA and UPA governments.

References

Defunct political parties in India
Janata Parivar
Political parties with year of establishment missing
Political parties disestablished in 1996
1996 disestablishments in India
Janata Dal
Political parties established in 1987
1987 establishments in India